Oleh Yuriiovych Kryshyn (born 27 November 1967, Dnipropetrovsk) is a Ukrainian entrepreneur, a patron and a political leader and statesman. People's Deputy of Ukraine of the 8th convocation.

Education 
In 1992 he graduated from the National Metallurgical Academy of Ukraine, qualification — metallurgic engineer. In 2004 he graduated from the same academy with an engineer-economist qualification.

Working Activity 
The Head of the Overlook Council Limited Liability Company «Vilnohirsk Sklo».

Elections, Party Activity 
2010–2014 – a deputy of Dnipropetrovsk Oblast Council.

In October 26, 2014 Kryshyn was elected a people’s deputy of the 8th convocation according to the single-seat majority constituency № 34, Dnipropetrovsk Oblast, as a self-nominated candidate. He got 24.29% votes.

In the Verkhovna Rada of the 8th convocation he was a member of deputy’s faction of the political party «People's Front (Ukraine)».

Post: the secretary of the Verkhovna Rada Committee on the Taxes and Customs House Issues.

References

External links 
 Facebook-page 

1967 births
Living people
21st-century Ukrainian economists
Businesspeople from Dnipro
Eighth convocation members of the Verkhovna Rada
21st-century Ukrainian politicians